Kelch-like ECH-associated protein 1 is a protein that in humans is encoded by the Keap1 gene.

Structure 

Keap1 has four discrete protein domains.  The N-terminal Broad complex, Tramtrack and Bric-à-Brac (BTB) domain contains the Cys151 residue, which is one of the important cysteines in stress sensing.  The intervening region (IVR) domain contains two critical cysteine residues, Cys273 and Cys288, which are a second group of cysteines important for stress sensing.  A double glycine repeat (DGR) and C-terminal region (CTR) domains collaborate to form a β-propeller structure, which is where Keap1 interacts with Nrf2.

Interactions 

Keap1 has been shown to interact with Nrf2, a master regulator of the antioxidant response, which is important for the amelioration of oxidative stress.

Under quiescent conditions, Nrf2 is anchored in the cytoplasm through binding to Keap1, which, in turn, facilitates the ubiquitination and subsequent proteolysis of Nrf2.  Such sequestration and further degradation of Nrf2 in the cytoplasm are mechanisms for the repressive effects of Keap1 on Nrf2.  Keap1 is not only a tumor suppressor gene, but also a metastasis suppressor gene.

Recently, several interesting studies have also identified a hidden circuit in NRF2 regulations. In the mouse Keap1 (INrf2) gene, Lee and colleagues   found that an AREs located on a negative strand can subtly connect Nrf2 activation to Keap1 transcription. When examining NRF2 occupancies in human lymphocytes, Chorley and colleagues identified an approximately 700 bp locus within the KEAP1 promoter region was consistently top rank enriched, even at the whole-genome scale. These basic findings have depicted a mutually influenced pattern between NRF2 and KEAP1. NRF2-driven KEAP1 expression characterized in human cancer contexts, especially in human squamous cell cancers, depicted a new perspective in understanding NRF2 signaling regulation.

As a drug target

Because Nrf2 activation leads to a coordinated antioxidant and anti-inflammatory response, and Keap1 represses Nrf2 activation, Keap1 has become a very attractive drug target.

A series of synthetic oleane triterpenoid compounds, known as antioxidant inflammation modulators (AIMs), are being developed by Reata Pharmaceuticals, Inc. and are potent inducers of the Keap1-Nrf2 pathway, blocking Keap1-dependent Nrf2 ubiquitination and leading to the stabilization and nuclear translocation of Nrf2 and subsequent induction of Nrf2 target genes. The lead compound in this series, bardoxolone methyl (also known as CDDO-Me or RTA 402), was in late-stage clinical trials for the treatment of chronic kidney disease (CKD) in patients with type 2 diabetes mellitus and showed an ability to improve markers of renal function in these patients. However, the Phase 3 trial was halted due to safety concerns.

Human health
Mutations in KEAP1 that result in loss-of-function are not linked to familial cancers, though they do predispose individuals to multinodular goiters. The proposed mechanism leading to goiter formation is that the redox stress experienced when the thyroid produces hormones selects for loss of heterozygosity of KEAP1, leading to the goiters.

Gallery

References

Further reading 

 
 
 
 
 
 
 
 
 
 
 
 
 
 
 
 
 
 

Kelch proteins